Marco Thomas (born November 27, 1983) is an American football wide receiver who is currently a free agent. He was signed by the New York Giants as an undrafted free agent in 2007. He played college football at Western Illinois.

Thomas has also been a member of the Oakland Raiders, New York Jets and San Diego Chargers.

Collegiate career
Marco Thomas was a member of the Western Illinois University Leathernecks. In 43 games, he caught 109 passes for 1,691 yards and 11 touchdowns

Professional career

NFL
Thomas began his NFL career as an undrafted free agent for the New York Giants. He also spent time with the New York Jets from 2007–08 and both the Oakland Raiders and San Diego Chargers in 2008.

Arena Football League
Thomas began his Arena Football League career with the Chicago Rush in 2010. Chicago picked up Thomas at the end of the season. He caught 25 passes for 323 yards and two touchdowns before a knee injury ended his season. In 2011, he returned to the Rush and caught 16 passes for 140 yards and one touchdown before being released. After his release, he joined the San Jose SaberCats. In 2014, Thomas was named First-team All-Arena as well as the Wide Receiver of the Year. On March 15, 2015, Thomas was assigned to the Philadelphia Soul.

Career receiving statistics

References

External links
Montreal Alouettes bio
Western Illinois Leathernecks bio

1983 births
Living people
Players of American football from Chicago
Players of Canadian football from Chicago
American football wide receivers
American players of Canadian football
Canadian football wide receivers
Western Illinois Leathernecks football players
New York Giants players
Oakland Raiders players
New York Jets players
San Diego Chargers players
Montreal Alouettes players
Chicago Rush players
San Jose SaberCats players
Iowa Barnstormers players
Philadelphia Soul players